Black Code or Black Codes may refer to:

Law 
Code Noir, or Black Code, slavery decree in 1685 France
Black Codes (United States), discriminatory state and local laws passed after the Civil War in 1860s
"Black code",  another name for Jim Crow laws in 1960s

Other 
Black Codes (From the Underground), a 1985 album by Wynton Marsalis
Black (code), a diplomatic cypher system used by the U.S. prior to its entry into the Second World War
Black Code (film), a Canadian documentary film
Sometimes Black code is synonymous for Black bag operation

See also
Code Black (disambiguation)